Down in Texas '71 is a live album by the Allman Brothers Band.  It was recorded on September 28, 1971 at the Austin Municipal Auditorium in Austin, Texas.  It was released on March 26, 2021.

This recording features the original lineup of the Allman Brothers Band.  Saxophonist Rudolph "Juicy" Carter sits in on six of the nine songs.  The album includes a bonus track with a 13-minute interview of Berry Oakley and Duane Allman for a radio station in Houston from June 6, 1971, about three months before the concert was recorded.

Critical reception 
In the Sarasota Herald-Tribune Wade Tatangelo wrote, "When the Allman Brothers arrived at the Austin Municipal Auditorium in Texas on Sept. 28, 1971, they were the hottest band in the country.... And while Carter's contributions are at times a bit too skronky, it's fascinating to hear how Duane Allman and Betts weave their twin guitar attacks around his often aggressive playing."

On Cryptic Rock Vito Tanzi said, "Collectively one of the greatest Southern Rock bands in history, the Allman Brothers Band built a legacy that defined the genre over the course of five decades.... For all the years of great music and countless live albums, you would think another live album would be too much. Well, for the Allman Brothers Band Down in Texas '71 is simply a gift adding to a plethora of live performances captured on tape for fans to enjoy."

Track listing 
"Statesboro Blues" (Will McTell) – 5:01
"Trouble No More" (McKinley Morganfield) – 4:43
"Don't Keep Me Wonderin'" (Gregg Allman) – 4:03
"Done Somebody Wrong" (Clarence Lewis, Elmore James, Morris Levy) – 3:36
"One Way Out" (Marshall Sehorn, Elmore James) – 5:26
"In Memory of Elizabeth Reed" [incomplete] (Dickey Betts) – 6:09
"Stormy Monday" (T-Bone Walker) – 9:03
"You Don't Love Me" (Willie Cobbs) – 15:11
"Hot 'Lanta" (Gregg Allman, Duane Allman, Dickey Betts, Butch Trucks, Berry Oakley, Jai Johanny Johanson) – 7:40
Berry Oakley and Duane Allman 06/06/71 Houston TX interview – 13:04

Personnel 
The Allman Brothers Band
Duane Allman – lead and slide guitars
Gregg Allman – vocals, Hammond B3 organ, piano
Dickey Betts – lead guitar
Berry Oakley – bass guitar
Jaimoe – drums, percussion
Butch Trucks – drums, tympani
Additional musicians
Rudolph "Juicy" Carter – saxophone on "Statesboro Blues", "Don't Keep Me Wonderin'", "In Memory of Elizabeth Reed", "Stormy Monday", "You Don't Love Me", "Hot 'Lanta"
Production
Produced by the Allman Brothers Band
Executive producer: Bert Holman
Project supervision: Kirk West, John Lynskey, Bill Levenson
Liner notes: John Lynskey
Mastering: Jason NeSmith
Package design: Terry Bradley

References 

The Allman Brothers Band live albums
2021 live albums